Chloraeinae is an orchid subtribe in the subfamily Orchidoideae.

References

External links

 
Orchid subtribes